A varsity match is a fixture (especially of a sporting event or team) between two university teams, particularly Oxford and Cambridge. The Scottish Varsity rugby match between the University of St Andrews and the University of Edinburgh at Murrayfield stadium is claimed to be the oldest recurring varsity match in the world, having been played since the 1860s. It is predated by the University Match in Cricket between Oxford and Cambridge, which was first played in 1827.

Varsity in England
The country's longest-running series of varsity matches is played between the University of Oxford and the University of Cambridge. In addition to the 1827 University Match in Cricket mentioned above, the first "Boat Race" in 1829 the first "Varsity Match" (in Rugby Union) in 1872, and the first "Varsity Game" (in Basketball) in 1921 were all contested between Oxford and Cambridge. Unusually for British university sporting events, both the Boat Race and Varsity Match are shown on broadcast television. Unlike many more recent varsity competitions, the Oxford–Cambridge matches stand alone rather than being part of a wider multi-sport varsity competition.

British newspaper The Independent proposed in 2008 that Bath vs Loughborough was "the real varsity match" on the basis that these were the top two teams (at that time) in British Universities Sports Association (BUSA) competitions. Since 2015, British Universities and Colleges Sport (BUCS), the successor to BUSA, has organised fixtures between Loughborough and Durham (the top two universities since 2011-12) to occur on the same day, in what has been termed the "BUCS Varsity".

A number of city and regional sporting rivalries exist between universities, which are also dubbed varsity matches. The Roses Tournament between the universities of York and Lancaster is one of the oldest and largest of these, dating back to 1965. It is frequently referred to as the largest inter-university sports tournament in Europe.

Interregional rivalries
Anglia Ruskin University vs University of East London
Challenge Cup
Bath Spa University vs University of Winchester
 Varsity
Bradford University vs King's College London
 The Tolstoy Cup
Camborne School of Mines vs Royal School of Mines
 The Bottle Match
University of Cambridge vs University of Oxford – every fixture between these two universities can be referred to as a varsity match; the most notable  are:
The Varsity Game - Basketball
The University Match - Cricket
University Golf Match
University Hockey Match
Ice Hockey Varsity Match
The Varsity Polo Match
The Boat Race, the Women's Boat Race and the Henley Boat Races - Rowing
The Varsity Match - Rugby Union
Rugby League Varsity Match
Varsity Trip - Skiing
The Varsity Yacht Race
Durham University vs Loughborough University
 BUCS Varsity
 Intramural Varsity (Durham colleges vs Loughborough intramural sports)
Durham University vs University of York
 College Varsity – between Durham colleges and York Colleges, started 2014 as a replacement for the White Rose Varsity
 James – Collingwood tournament annually between James College, York and Collingwood College, Durham since 2009.
 Josephine Butler – Langwith varsity: Annual home-and-away  (York in the autumn, Durham in the summer) tournaments between Josephine Butler College, Durham and Langwith College, York held since 2013.
 Lancaster University vs University of York
 The Roses Tournament
 University of Leeds vs University of Liverpool vs University of Manchester
 The Christie Cup
 Leeds Beckett University vs Manchester Metropolitan University
 Battle of the North
 University of Sunderland vs York St John University
 Varsity

Regional rivalries

East
University of East Anglia vs University of Essex
 Derby Day

London

King's College London vs University College London 
 London Varsity Series – multiple sports over 8 days, culminating in the London Varsity rugby match
 London School of Economics vs Imperial College London
 The City Varsity – men's and women's rugby
Brunel University vs St Mary's University, Twickenham
 West London Varsity – Rugby, Football, Basketball, Netball and Cricket. 
 City, University of London vs Kingston University London
 Varsity
University of East London vs Middlesex University
Varsity – replaced by UEL vs Anglia Ruskin Challenge Cup from 2016
Goldsmiths, University of London vs University of the Arts London 
 The Arts Cup – Basketball, Football, Hockey, Netball and Rugby
Imperial College London vs Imperial College School of Medicine 
 VarsityFest – Rugby, Hockey, Netball, Football, Lacrosse, Basketball, Tennis
King's College London vs King's College London School of Medicine 
 The Macadam Cup – Swimming gala, Water polo, Badminton, Squash, Hockey (men and women), Mixed fencing, Mixed tennis, Ultimate frisbee, Rugby (men and women), Netball, Lacrosse, Football (men and women) and Darts
 University of London Colleges and Imperial College School of Medicine
 Allom Cup – Rowing
Queen Mary, University of London vs Queen Mary, University of London, Barts and The London School of Medicine and Dentistry 
 The Merger Cup – rugby, football, hockey, rowing, tennis, badminton, netball, squash, and basketball 
University of West London vs University of Westminster
West London Varsity

Midlands
Aston University vs Birmingham City University
 Varsity
University of Birmingham vs University of Birmingham Medics
 Brum Rugby Varsity
University of Birmingham vs University of Warwick
 Varsity Boat Race (2006 and 2012)
Coventry University vs University of Warwick
Varsity
Derby University vs University of Hertfordshire
Varsity
De Montfort University vs University of Leicester
 Varsity
Keele University vs Staffordshire University 
Varsity (from 2001)
Loughborough University vs University of Nottingham
 IMS Varsity – between intramural sports teams
University of Nottingham vs Nottingham Trent University
 Nottingham Varsity (2004–present)

North East
Durham University vs Newcastle University
 The Boat Race of the North – Rowing (since 1997)
Newcastle University vs Northumbria University
 The Stan Calvert Cup (1994-2018)
University of Sunderland vs University of Teesside
 Varsity

North West
University of Central Lancashire vs Edge Hill University
Varsity
University of Chester vs Salford University
Varsity (from 2016)
University of Liverpool vs Liverpool John Moores University
 Liverpool Varsity
University of Manchester vs Manchester Metropolitan University
 Varsity
University of Manchester vs University of Salford 
 The Two Cities Rugby League Challenge 
 The Two Cities Boat Race – Rowing (from 1972)

South East
University of Bedfordshire vs University of Northampton
 Varsity
University of Bournemouth vs Southampton Solent University
Varsity
University of Brighton vs University of Sussex
 Varsity
Buckinghamshire New University vs University of Roehampton
 Varsity
Canterbury Christ Church University vs University of Kent 
Canterbury Varsity
University of Chichester vs University of Winchester 
Varsity
Kingston University vs University of Surrey
Varsity (2010 to 2016, replaced by Kingston vs City and Surrey vs Royal Holloway)
Oxford Brookes University vs University of Reading
Varsity
University of Portsmouth vs University of Southampton
 Varsity Cup
 Royal Holloway, University of London vs University of Surrey
Varsity

South West
University of Bath vs University of Exeter
Rugby Varsity
University of Bristol vs University of West England 
Varsity
University of Plymouth vs University of St Mark & St John
Varsity
University of Worcester vs University of Gloucestershire
Varsity

Yorkshire and the Humber
University of Bradford vs University of Huddersfield
University of Hull vs University of Teesside vs York St. John University
 The Tri-Varsity (ended 2008)
University of Hull vs University of Lincoln 
The Humber Games – inaugurated in 2014 after Hull's annual series with York ended in acrimony in 2013.
University of Hull vs University of York
The White Rose Varsity Tournament (contested from 2005 to 2011 between York and York St John University) was a short-lived series established in 2011. It was discontinued in 2013 due to disagreements between the two universities.
University of Leeds vs Leeds Beckett University
 Leeds Varsity
University of Sheffield vs Sheffield Hallam University
 Sheffield Varsity (1996 – present) 
University of York vs York St. John University
 White Rose Varsity Tournament (until 2011)

Varsity in Ireland
University College Dublin v. Trinity College Dublin
 Colours Boat Races
 The Colours Match - Rugby Union

Varsity in Scotland
University of Aberdeen v. Robert Gordon University 
 Granite City Challenge
 Aberdeen Universities Boat Race - Rowing
University of Abertay Dundee v. University of Dundee
 The Tay Games Varsity Challenge
University of Edinburgh v. Heriot-Watt University
 Varsity Quaich - Men’s Football, Men’s and Women’s Hockey, Men’s Rugby and Rowing
University of St Andrews v. University of Edinburgh
 The Scottish Varsity - Rugby
The Johnny Wookey Memorial Varsity - Ice Hockey
 University of Edinburgh v. University of Glasgow
 The Scottish Boat Race - Rowing
 University of the West of Scotland v. Edinburgh Napier University
 East vs West Varsity - Men's American Football, Mixed Badminton, Men's Basketball, Men's and Women's Hockey, Men's Rugby
 University of the West of Scotland v. Scottish Rural College v. Ayrshire College
 West Coast Varsity

Varsity in Wales
Cardiff University v. Swansea University 
Welsh Varsity - Rugby
 Varsity Shield
The Welsh Boat Race - Rowing
Aberystwyth University v. Bangor University
 Aberystwyth-Bangor Varsity

See also 
College rivalry
College athletics
Varsity team

References 

College sports rivalries
Student culture
Sports matches